The 2016–17 Argentine Primera División – Torneo de la Independencia was the 127th season of top-flight professional football in Argentina. The tournament was named in commemoration of the 200th anniversary of the Independence of Argentina.

The season began on August 26, 2016 and ended on June 27, 2017. Thirty teams competed in the league, twenty-nine returning from the 2016 season, and the addition of Talleres de Córdoba as the Primera B Nacional champion. Argentinos Juniors did not take part having been relegated the previous season.

Boca Juniors were crowned champions of Argentina for a 32nd time after rivals Banfield were beaten by San Lorenzo on June 20, 2017. As a result, Boca Juniors qualified for the 2018 Copa Libertadores and the 2017 Supercopa Argentina.

Competition format 
The tournament for the 2016 season was composed of 30 teams. Each team played the other 29 teams in a single round-robin tournament, and also played an additional match against its main rival team, named "Fecha de Clásicos" (Derbies Fixture).

Club information

Stadia and locations

Personnel

Managerial changes 

Interim Managers
1. Interim manager in the 1st round.
2.  Alberto Fanesi was interim manager in the 5th round.
3.  Juan Carlos Pires was interim manager in the 9th round.
4. Interim manager, but later promoted to manager.
5.  Luciano Precone was interim manager in the 11th and 12th rounds.
6.  Hugo Garelli was interim manager in the 12th–14th rounds.
7.  Néstor Apuzzo was interim manager in the 13th and 14th rounds.
8.  Juan Barbas was interim manager in the 13th and 14th rounds.
9.  Leonardo Fernández was interim manager in the 14th round.
10.  Fabián Castro was interim manager in the 17th round.
11.  Leonardo Lemos was interim manager in the 19th round.
12.  Eduardo Magnín was interim manager in the 22nd round.
13. Interim manager until the end of the tournament.
14.  Diego Erroz was interim manager in the 29th round.
15. Interim manager in the 30th round.

League table

Results 
Teams play every other team once (either at home or away), and play one additional round against their local derby rival (or assigned match by AFA if a club doesn't have derby), completing a total of 30 rounds.

Season statistics

Top Goalscorers 

Source: AFA

Top Assists

Source: AFA

Relegation
Relegation at the end of the season is based on coefficients, which take into consideration the points obtained by the clubs during the present season and the three previous seasons (only seasons at the top-flight are counted). The total tally is then divided by the total number of games played in the top flight on those four seasons and an average is calculated. The four teams with the worst average at the end of the season are relegated to Primera B Nacional.

Source: AFA

See also
2016–17 Primera B Nacional
2015–16 Copa Argentina
2016–17 Copa Argentina

References 

Argentine Primera División seasons
2016–17 in Argentine football leagues